The Lawless Years is an American crime drama series that aired on NBC from April 16, 1959, to September 22, 1961. The series is the first of its kind, set during the Roaring 20s, having antedated ABC's far more successful The Untouchables by six months

Cast

Main
 James Gregory as Barney Ruditsky
 Robert Karnes as Max Fields
 John Dennis as Dutch Schultz
 Norman Alden as Lulu
 Brad Trumbull as Brody
 John Vivyan as Louis Buchalter
 Stanley Adams as Gurrah
 Carol Eve Rossen as Anna
 Paul Richards as Louis 'Louy' Kassoff
 Robert Ellenstein as Legs Diamond
 Henry Corden as Wavey Gordon
 Robert Sampson as Mad Dog Coll

Guest stars
 Tige Andrews 
 Clegg Hoyt
 Martin Landau
 Ruta Lee 
 Vic Morrow
 Warren Oates
 Burt Reynolds 
 Harry Dean Stanton
 Nita Talbot

Episodes

Season 1: Spring/Summer 1959

Season 2: Fall 1959

Season 3: Spring/Summer 1961

References

External links 
 

1959 American television series debuts
1961 American television series endings
1950s American crime drama television series
1960s American crime drama television series
Black-and-white American television shows
English-language television shows
Cultural depictions of gangsters
NBC original programming
Television series set in the 1920s
Television shows set in New York City
Television series about organized crime
Television series by CBS Studios
Cultural depictions of Dutch Schultz
Cultural depictions of Louis Buchalter
Cultural depictions of Mad Dog Coll
Cultural depictions of Legs Diamond
Films scored by Raoul Kraushaar
Works about Irish-American organized crime
Works about Jewish-American organized crime